Greenwreath, also known as the Foreman House, is a historic home located near Greenville, Pitt County, North Carolina. It was built about 1791, and is a -story, five bay frame dwelling with beaded siding and an exterior end chimney.  It has a rear shed wing. Also on the property are the contributing tenant house, outbuilding, and a small Victorian-period brick ice house.

It was added to the National Register of Historic Places in 1982.

References

Houses on the National Register of Historic Places in North Carolina
Houses completed in 1791
Houses in Pitt County, North Carolina
National Register of Historic Places in Greenville, North Carolina